The 2019–20 Kerala Premier League Season was the seventh season of the Kerala Premier League. The season featured 10 teams which was divided into 2 groups and were played on a home-and-away format. The season kicked off on 15 December 2019. Former participants
Kozhikode Quartz FC, SBI Kerala, RFC Kochi, FC Thrissur withdrew from the league due to financial problems. Meanwhile, Kannur City FC withdrew mid-way throughout the tournament due to some technical issues. Kerala Blasters FC  beat Gokulam Kerala F.C. in the finals and lifted their first KPL Title.

Teams
Kochi City FC , Shooter Padne and Indian Navy withdrawn from the league. To these vacancies Kannur City FC and Mar Athanasius FA were selected by playing the qualifiers. Luca Soccer Club joined the league through corporate entry after losing in the qualifier.

Stadiums and locations

Head coaches

Foreign players
Clubs can sign maximum four players  but only three is allowed in the playing eleven.

Qualifiers 
Kerala Premier League Qualifier - KPLQ

Fixtures and results 
Source: 
 Cancelled Matches

Group stage

Group A

Fixtures and results
Source: 
 Cancelled Matches

Group B

Fixtures and results
Source: 
 Cancelled Matches

Knockout stage

Fixtures and results 
Semi-Finals

Final

Season statistics

Scoring

Top scorers

References

Kerala Premier League seasons
Kerala Premier League